

Winners and nominees

2010s

2020s

Records  
 Most awarded program: La rosa de Guadalupe, 5 times.
 Most nominated program: La rosa de Guadalupe and Como dice el dicho with 7 nominations.
 Most nominated program without a win: Laura with 2 nominations.
 Program winning after short time: Como dice el dicho (2015, 2016 and 2017), 3 consecutive years.
 Program winning after long time: La rosa de Guadalupe (2014 and 2018), 4 years difference.

References

External links 
TVyNovelas at esmas.com
TVyNovelas Awards at the univision.com

Unit Program
Unit Program
Unit Program